The Responaut was a quarterly magazine that was by, for and about respirator-aided and other gadget-aided people.

It was first published in December 1963 and ran until 1989.

It was conceived and edited by Ann Armstrong, who was herself a respirator user since she contracted respiratory polio in 1955.

The magazine regularly featured many progressive disabled people of the time including Megan Du Boisson (founder of the Disabled Income Group), and Paul Hunt, one of the founders of the Union of the Physically Impaired Against Segregation.

There are also articles from noted people of the era, including Stirling Moss, Canon W R Birt, Robin Cavendish, Raymond Baxter, Lord Snowdon, Lord Willis, Alfred Morris (MP), Lord Aberdare and many more.

The magazine was filled with contributions from people all over the world that lived with disability every day and still found time to form a vibrant, interactive, inventive community long before the internet.

References

Health magazines